The Longest Nite (Literal Title: Dark Flowers)  is a 1998 Hong Kong crime thriller film directed by Patrick Yau and Johnnie To, starring Lau Ching-wan and Tony Leung Chiu-wai. The film was produced by To and Wai Ka-fai along with their production company, Milkyway Image.

Plot
Caught in the middle of a fierce gang war in Macao, a corrupt cop named Sam (Tony Leung Chiu-wai) handles negotiations between two Triad leaders who plan to join forces. He meets a suspicious bald man named Tony (Lau Ching-wan), who keeps following him around and disrupting his personal business. But when Sam finds out he's a suspect in a nightclub owner's murder, he's sure his stalker has something to do with it.

Production
Wai Ka-fai re-wrote most of the script of The Longest Nite with Johnnie To. To and Wai had the film take place in Macau based on the chaos the area was experiencing at the time of filming. Wai Ka-fai has stated that most of The Longest Nite was directed by To. To took over directing the film after Patrick Yau had shot five scenes with Wai Ka-fai re-writing the script as they were shooting. Large portions of the film were shot in Macau.

The Hong Kong title of the film translates to Dark Flowers, a slang for an underworld contract.

Release
The Longest Nite was released in Hong Kong on 1 January 1998. The film grossed a total of HK$9,562,090 on its release. The Longest Nite was not a box office success in Hong Kong, which led to Milkyway Image developing more commercial films such as Needing You... (2000).

Reception
In Variety, Derek Elley referred to the film as "at the very least an attention-grabbing movie that puts a new spin on Hong Kong crimers" and "the movie has something of the risk-taking spirit that first drove the H.K. New Wave almost 20 years ago."

Awards and nominations

See also
 List of films set in Macau

Notes

References

External links 
 

Hong Kong crime thriller films
1998 crime thriller films
1998 films

Police detective films 
1990s Cantonese-language films
Milkyway Image films
Films set in Macau
Films about contract killing
Films with screenplays by Yau Nai-hoi
1990s Hong Kong films